The Russian famine of 1891–1892 began along the Volga River and spread as far as the Urals and Black Sea. It caused 375,000 to 400,000 deaths. The reawakening of Russian Marxism and populism is often traced to the public's anger over the tsarist government's poor handling of the disaster.

Weather 
In 1891, a particularly-dry spring had delayed the planting of the fields. When the Volga River flooded, the lack of fire caused the water to freeze, which killed more seedlings and the fodder used to feed the horses. The seedlings that were not killed by frost were blown away along with the topsoil in an uncommonly-windy water. The summer started as early as April and proved to be a long dry one. The city of Orenburg, for example, had no rain for over 100 days. Forests, horses, crops, and peasants all began to die, and by the end of 1892, about 375,000 to 400,000 people had died, mostly from the cholera epidemics that were triggered by the famine.

Other causes 
Weather alone cannot be blamed, as there was enough grain in Russia to feed the starving areas. The peasants used medieval technology like wooden ploughs and sickles. They rarely had modern fertilizers or machinery (the Petrovsky Academy, in Moscow, was Russia's only agricultural school). Russia's primitive railways were not up to redistributing grain. The main blame was laid at the government, which was discredited by the famine. It refused to use the word  but called it a poor harvest, and stopped the papers from reporting on it. The main reasons that the blame fell on the government were that grain exports were not banned until mid-August and merchants even had a month's warning and so they could quickly export their reserves. Minister of Finance Ivan Vyshnegradsky even opposed the late ban. He was seen as the main cause of the disaster, as it was his policy to raise consumer taxes to force peasants to sell more grain. Even Russia's capitalists realized that the industrialization drive had been too hard on the peasants.

The government also contributed to the famine indirectly by conscripting peasant sons and sending taxmen to seize livestock when grain ran out. The government also implemented a system of redemption payments as compensation to landlords who had lost their serfs, who, across Russia, had gained their freedom as part of reforms a few years earlier that were instigated by Tsar Alexander.

Relief efforts  

On 17 November 1891, the government asked the people to form voluntary anti-famine organizations. Leo Tolstoy, the most famous volunteer, blamed the Tsar and the Russian Orthodox Church for the famine. As a result, the Orthodox Church excommunicated Tolstoy and forbade citizens from accepting help from his relief organization. The future Tsar Nicholas II headed the relief committee and was a member of the finance committee three months later, and the Tsar and Tsarina raised 5 and 12 million rubles, respectively. Alexander III's sister-in-law Grand Duchess Elizabeth also raised money by selling peasant crafts in bazaars. Nicholas II said, "A great honor, but little satisfaction.... I must admit I never even suspected its [finance committee's] existence." The zemstvos got 150 million roubles from the government to buy food but were allowed to lend only to peasants who could repay them and were therefore the least needy. Starving peasants had to eat raw donated flour and "famine bread", a mixture of moss, goosefoot, bark and husks. In February 1892, the government bought 30,000 Kyrgyz horses so that the fields could be plowed.

The United States formed Russian Famine Relief Committee of the United States []. The organization was mostly self-funded by donations. A "Famine Fleet" [""] was assembled to transport agricultural products to Russia, with the first ship, the Indiana, arriving at Liepāja on 16 March 1892 with 1,900 tons of food. The second ship, Missouri, called at Liepaja on 4 April 1892 and delivered a further 2,500 tons of grain and corn flour. Another ship carrying humanitarian aid arrived in Riga in May, and additional ships followed in June and July. The total cost of the humanitarian aid provided by the United States in 1891–1892 was estimated to be around US$1 million (equivalent to $ million in ).

Based on some American sources, the US government (through the Department of the Interior) provided financial assistance to certain Russian regions (guberniyas), mainly in the form of loans, in the amount of US$75 million (equivalent to $ billion in ).

The events were pictured in 1892 by the famous Russian painter Ivan Aivazovsky [] who painted two pictures, "The Ship of Help" [""] and "Food Distribution" [""]. These paintings were recently sold by Sotheby's Auctions.

Economic consequences

See also 
 Droughts and famines in Russia and the Soviet Union

References

Further reading 
 Johnson, Eric M. (2015) "Demographics, Inequality and Entitlements in the Russian Famine of 1891". The Slavonic and East European Review 93, no. 1 (2015): 96–119.

External links 
 David P. Lilly. The Russian Famine of 1891–1992. The Student Historical Journal, 1994–1995.
 Spiridovich, Alexander. Revolutionary movement in Russia. Ed. 2. 

1891 in the Russian Empire
1892 in the Russian Empire
Famines in Russia
Economic crises in Europe
1890s health disasters
19th-century famines